The 2013 Rugby League World Cup featured the national teams (selected from twenty-four-man squads) of fourteen nations.

Pool A

Australia
With New Zealand claiming the trophy in 2008 and no tournament having been held prior to that since 2000, Australia's squad didn't feature a single World Cup winner.

Head coach:  Tim Sheens

England
Head coach:  Steve McNamara

* Replaced initially named Gareth Hock prior to the tournament.

Fiji
Head coach:  Rick Stone

*  Replaced initially named John Sutton prior to the tournament.

Ireland
Head coach:  Mark Aston

* Replaced initially named Simon Grix who was ruled out by injury prior to the tournament.

Pool B

New Zealand
Head coach:  Stephen Kearney

*  Replaced initially named Tohu Harris prior to the tournament.

Papua New Guinea
Head coach:  Adrian Lam

* Replaced initially named James Segeyaro who was ruled out by injury.

France
Head coach:  Richard Agar

* Replaced initially named Clément Soubeyras and Mathias Pala who were ruled out by injuries.

Samoa
Head coach:  Matt Parish

1 Replaced Roy Asotasi who withdrew from the side.

2 Replaced initially named Arden McCarthy, Masada Iosefa and Teofilo Lepou who were ruled out by injuries

3 Allowed to be called up mid-tournament, following injuries to Harrison Hansen, Reni Maitua and Frank Winterstein.

Pool C

Scotland
Head coach:  Steve McCormack

* Replaced initially named Gareth Moore and Jonathan Walker who were ruled out by injuries.

Tonga
Head coach:  Charlie Tonga

Italy
Head coach:  Carlo Napolitano

* Replaced initially named Terry Campese, Craig Gower and Vic Mauro who were ruled out by injuries prior to the tournament.

Pool D

Cook Islands
Head coach:  David Fairleigh

* Replaced initially named Geoff Daniela who was ruled out by injury.

United States
Head coach:  Terry Matterson

 Luke Hume was initially named in the squad but was replaced due to injury by Taylor Welch prior to the tournament.
Andrew Durutalo was ruled out due to injury and replaced by Eddy Pettybourne.
 Ryan McGoldrick was initially named in the squad but withdrew from the squad for family reasons prior to the tournament.
Mark Cantoni was named but withdrew after breaking his arm in a warm up match against France.

Wales
Head coach:  Iestyn Harris

References

Squads
Rugby League World Cup squads